The 2016–17 Latvian Basketball League was the 26th season of the top basketball league of Latvia. The regular season started on 28 September 2016.

BK Valmiera was the defending champion, with VEF Rīga winning the league by defeating Ventspils in the finals by 4–0.

Competition format
After Jelgava's withdrawal, ten teams will join the league. The two first qualified teams will join directly the semifinals while teams between third and sixth will qualify to the quarterfinals.

Teams

League table

Playoffs
Seeded teams played games 1, 3, 5 and 7 at home.

References

External links
Latvian Basketball Federation

Latvijas Basketbola līga
Latvian
Basketball